Hari Bhoomi is a daily newspaper published in North and Central India. Established on 5 September 1996 as a weekly Hindi language newspaper, in November 1997, it was converted into a daily newspaper and was started in Haryana as the Hari Bhoomi 'Rohtak’ edition. With this edition the newspaper covered news from the whole state of Haryana.

In April 1998 the media group started ‘Delhi’ edition to cover news from the capital of India, and NCR region including Faridabad and Gurgaon. In March 2001 the group entered into the Chhattisgarh and started Bilaspur Edition, after which in June 2002 it started its office in Bilaspur and started its Raipur Edition. With the Raipur Edition Hari Bhoomi also covers parts of Orissa.
 
In October 2008 HariBhoomi Jabalpur Edition began in Madhya pradesh. Later same year HariBhoomi Raigarh Edition started in Chhattisgarh.

Circulation and readership

Readership
As per the figures of IRS 2019Q4 HariBhoomi is established as the 10th largest Hindi Daily in India with 15 lakhs readers. Hari Bhoomi is the largest read and circulated daily of Chhattisgarh with 9.66 lakhs readers (IRS 2019Q4) and 3.90 lakhs copies. Hari Bhoomi has a circulation of approx 2.11 in Madhya Pradesh with its Bhopal and Jabalpur edition. Hari Bhoomi has a circulation of 1.48 lakhs copies in Haryana with its Rohtak edition ( July-Dec 2019) and has a readership of 3.58 lakhs as per.

Management
Abhimanyu Sindhu is the founding proprietor and editor-in-chief and Kulbir Chhikara is the group editor.

See also
 Sindhu Education Foundation

References

External links
  

Hindi-language newspapers
Mass media in Chhattisgarh
Mass media in Haryana
Mass media in Madhya Pradesh
1996 establishments in Delhi
Newspapers established in 1996